Bangaarada Manushya (Golden Man) is a 1972 Indian Kannada language film based on T. K. Rama Rao's novel of same name. Ramarao was known for his crime and detective novels, but this film was a social drama. It was directed by S. Siddalingaiah under the banner Srinidhi Productions. Prior to this, Siddalingaiah had worked with Rajkumar in Mayor Muthanna. It stars Rajkumar and Bharathi. The film was screened for over two years at the States Theatre (now Bhumika Theatre) in Bangalore and was screened for sixty weeks in Chamundeshwari theatre in Mysore, the film Completed one year in many centres and twenty five weeks in every major and minor centre. The movie saw a 25 weeks run when it was re-released in 1988.

The film was produced by R. Lakshman and Gopal, the film set new standards in the production design. Breaking away from conventional movie making, the producers preferred an open discussion with the crew and preliminary survey of outdoor shooting venues. While Lakshman was a Kannada activist closely associated with a league of frontline writers such as A.N. Krishna Rao and M.N. Murthy and managing the famous Bharat Talkies on the J.C. Road, Gopal was his close associate with a penchant for cinema. Most of the film was shot in Kalasa village in Chikmagalur district.

The music for the film was composed by G. K. Venkatesh. All five songs of the film became hits. Among the five songs, the song "Aagadu Endu Kai Katti Kulithare" became an inspirational song to the people. All the songs were sung by P. Susheela and P. B. Srinivas.

The film became the highest grossing Kannada film at the time of its release . Today this film is viewed as a milestone in Rajkumar's career. On the centenary of Indian cinema in April 2013, Forbes included Rajkumar's performance in the film on its list, "25 Greatest Acting Performances of Indian Cinema". The film was remade in Telugu in 1975 as Devudulanti Manishi, starring Krishna.

Plot

Rajiva, who is on his way to visit his sister Sharadha upon reaching, he finds to his astonishment that his brother-in-law has died. Now there is no one left to look after Rajiv's elder sister's family.To improve the condition of his sister's family, Rajiva takes a loan and begins irrigation in his brother-in-law's land.

Sharada's sons, Keshava and Chakrapani  leave for Bengaluru for their higher studies. Rajiva and his neighbour's daughter Lakshmi fall in love with each other. Rajiva decides to buy 25 acres of barren land near the village from the government. Rajiva now makes huge profits and is a respectable person in the village.

Rajiva keeps going to another city, Belgaum every 6 months. On one of his trips to Belgaum, Rajiva visits a woman, Sharavathi and her son, Kishore in Belagaum. 

Keshava marries Rajiva and Sharada's elder brother Ramachandra's daughter, Nagaveni. Chakrapani agrees to marry a family friend's daughter Nandini. Sridhar, a friend of Keshava and Chakrapani, marry Saraswati, Sharada's only daughter. Finally Rajiva agrees to marry Lakshmi. 

Patil,  Sharavathi's neighbor, informs Keshava of Rajiva's periodical visit to Belgaum. To confirm the disturbing news given by Patil, Keshava goes to Belgaum and sees Rajiva's photo hanging in Sharavathi's house.When asked who he was, Sharavathi replies "Mane Yajamanrudu (House owner)". With no respect for Rajiva anymore, Keshava confronts Rajiv. and asks 50,000 Rupees so that he could start a business. Rajiva doesn't agree and refuses to give him money until he learns its value. Keshava in anger reveals to Lakshmi and Sharada about Sharavathi, accusing Rajiva of adultery. Both of them refuse to believe this and decide not to tell Rajiva that they know about Sharavathi. One afternoon, Lakshmi  decides to give lunch for her husband in the field. On her way to the field, a bull chases her. Even though Rajiva fights off the bull, Lakshmi falls into a nearby well and by the time Rajiva dives in to save her, it is too late.

Nagaveni convinces Keshava to seek legal help in reclaiming what is rightfully his. The latter visits Rajiva to discuss the matter to which Rajiva and Sharadha disagree.  While a verbal fight breaks out between the son and the mother, Keshava hurls some hurtful words at Rajiva. He accuses Rajiva of stealing their property and taking advantage of their situation. He goes to the extent of saying that the rice in front of him is not his. Hearing this, Rajiva washes his hands without having eaten a morsel of rice. Quietly Rajiva walks out of the house while praying for the well-being of the villagers. Chakrapani tracks down Sharavathi and brings her to Rajiva's house to show Rajiva's greatness to Keshava. Sharavathi reveals that she is their step-sister, i.e., she was the illegitimate child of Sharadha's husband. Rajiva had kept this a secret and had helped her all these years.

All set out to search for Rajiva, but they do not find him. Rajiva quietly walks into the sunset.

Cast

Production
The film was shot at Kalasapura and in Chikmagalur.

Soundtrack

The soundtrack of the film was composed by G. K. Venkatesh, with lyrics penned by Hunsur Krishnamurthy, Chi. Udaya Shankar, R. N. Jayagopal and Vijaya Narasimha. The two romantic songs "Aaha Mysooru Mallige" and "Baala Bangaara Neenu, Haneya Singara Neenu" have withstood the test of time. The audio was later released on Saregama.

The song "Aaha Mysooru Mallige" was later used by G. K. Venkatesh in the 1977 Telugu movie Chakradhari as "Naalo Evevo Vinthalu", which incidentally was the remake of 1974 Kannada movie Bhakta Kumbara, also starring Rajkumar, with music composition by G. K. Venkatesh.

Reception

Critical response 
Despite the overwhelming response, the film attracted strong criticism from a section of writers. Commenting on the purpose and narrative mode of the film, the late novelist Alanahalli Krishna said, "The film shows scant respect to the audience by showing a close-up of the hero’s footwear in the very beginning of the film. It encourages idol worship." On the other hand, writer U. R. Ananthamurthy said the film was deceptive and would lead the young audience believe that they too will grow rich overnight like their hero Rajiva in the film. Irrespective of the flak, the film was set to redefine the course of Kannada commercial cinema. Bangarada Manushya had drawn the audience to the cinema hall in an unprecedented manner.

Box office 
The film was screened for over 104 weeks at the States Theatre (now Bhumika Theatre) in Bangalore and was screened for 60 weeks in Chamundeshwari theatre in Mysore, the film Completed one year in many centers and twenty five weeks in every major and minor center. The film collected ₹ 2.5 crores (equivalent to ₹88 crores in 2021) at the box office and was the highest grossing Kannada film at the time. The film saw a 25 weeks run when it was re-released in 1988.

Awards
The movie received following awards at 1971–72 Karnataka State Film Awards 
 Second Best Film
 Best Supporting Actor — T. N. Balakrishna
 Best Screenplay — S. Siddalingaiah
 Best Cinematographer — D. V. Rajaram
 Best Editing — P. Bhakthavathsalam
The film screened at IFFI 1992 Kannada cinema Retrospect.

Legacy
Bangaarada Manushya had a tremendous impact on moviegoers. Some city youth, inspired by the movie's central theme—returning to one's ancestral village—left their jobs, came back to their respective villages and took to agriculture. The film had a phenomenal box office run and was screened for two years in a row in the States film theatre on Kempe Gowda road in Bangalore. The film had a deep social impact on the audience as well and there are many stories of people in the city going to villages and becoming farmers. The film also touched on very important topics like rural development, modern agricultural practices, co-operative movement, social unity, honesty, love and dedication. In the beginning of the movie, it shows the hardship of farmers and how much they have to toil in order to make ends meet. The movie subtly says that middle-class and working-class are the backbone of the country by showing the son of a rich village head as being a spoiled brat wasting his money in the city. One of the most important messages given in the movie is that, one should not waste time and money in trying to modernize/westernize themselves through a posh lifestyle. One should be true to his identity and not try to become someone else. This theme struck a chord with the audience as Karnataka was one of the fast developing states in the country and there was a large migration from rural to urban areas.

After the film ran for a year just at the States theatre in Bangalore, the management of the cinema hall decided to stop screening the film to accommodate a new film. This caused public outrage and took a violent turn. However, S. Bangarappa, the then MLA, intervened and resolved the issue successfully. The film went on to complete two years.

The film was remade in Telugu in 1975 as Devudulanti Manishi, starring Krishna. On the centenary of Indian cinema in April 2013, Forbes India included the performances of Rajkumar in the film on its list, "25 Greatest Acting Performances of Indian Cinema". The 2017 film Bangara s/o Bangarada Manushya starring Dr. Rajkumar's son Shiva Rajkumar had a similar plot dealing with the problems of farmers.

The film inspired the name of a book.

Rajkumar: The Inimitable Actor With A Golden Voice 
The English translation of the book Bangarada Manushya named Rajkumar: The Inimitable Actor With A Golden Voice was released in New Jersey, United States on 10 May 2008. The same book was released in London, England by Edward Thamson, Senator during the month of August 2008. The late thespian Rajkumar, who made Kannadigas proud with his brilliant acting skills and his golden voice, the book dedicated to him, in English. Rajkumar: The Inimitable Actor With A Golden Voice was released by the actor's wife Parvathamma Rajkumar in May 2008 at Bangalore also. She handed over the first copy to Professor K. S. Nissar Ahemed, the famous poet and Padmshree Awardee. The book, originally written in Kannada by A. N. Prahlada Rao, and titled Bangarada Manushya (The Golden Man), was first released in 2005 in the presence of Rajkumar himself. It ran into four editions and sold over 15,000 copies. The book has been translated into English by literary critic C. N. Ramachandran and journalist Alladi Jayashri. Published by Sapna Book House, Bangalore. To mark the completion of 75 years of Kannada film industry, the book has been released in New Jersey, America on 10 May 2008 sponsored by Brindavana, the Kannada Association of New Jersey. On this occasion, the author A. N. Prahalada Rao and his wife Mallika Prahlad have been honoured by the resident Kannadigas from New Jersey, New York, Washington DC and other surrounding cities.

Notes

References

External links
 
 

1972 films
1970s Kannada-language films
Indian drama films
Films about farmers
Films about social issues in India
Films based on Indian novels
Films scored by G. K. Venkatesh
Films directed by Siddalingaiah
Kannada films remade in other languages
1972 drama films